This is a list of the European Hot 100 Singles and European Top 100 Albums number ones of 1986, as published by Music & Media magazine (known as Eurotipsheet until April 1986).

Chart history

References

Europe
1986
1986